This is a list of all Diners, Drive-Ins and Dives episodes.

Episodes

Season 1 (2007)

Season 2 (2007–2008)

Season 3 (2008)

Season 4 (2008)

Season 5 (2008–2009)

Season 6 (2009)

Season 7 (2009)

Season 8 (2009–2010)

Season 9 (2010)

Season 10 (2010)

Season 11 (2011)

Season 12 (2011)

Season 13 (2011–2012)

Season 14 (2012)

Season 15 (2012)

Season 16 (2012–2013)

Season 17 (2013)

Season 18 (2013–2014)

Season 19 (2014)

Season 20 (2014)

Season 21 (2014)

Season 22 (2015)

Season 23 (2015)

Season 24 (2016)

Season 25 (2016)

Season 26 (2017)

Season 27 (2017–2018)

Season 28 (2017–2018)

Season 29 (2018–2019)

Season 30 (2019)

Season 31 (2019–2020)

Season 32 (2019–2020)

Season 33 (2020-2021)

Season 34 (2020-2022)

Season 35 (2021-2022)

Season 36 (2022-2023)

Season 37 (2023)

References 

Diners, Drive-Ins, and Dives